The 1975 Western Kentucky football team represented Western Kentucky University during the 1975 NCAA Division II football season. The team came off an 7–3 record from the prior season and was led by coach Jimmy Feix. They claimed a share of the Ohio Valley Conference championship and returned to the NCAA Division II Football Championship for the second time in three years.  One of the highlights of the season was a victory over NCAA Division I Louisville.  The Hilltoppers won their first two playoff games, including a win over New Hampshire in the Grantland Rice Bowl, before falling in the championship game to Northern Michigan in the Camellia Bowl.   They finished ranked 3rd in both the AP and UPI final polls.

This team was one of the best in school history and included future National Football League (NFL) players David Carter, Darryl Drake, Rick Caswell, and Biff Madon.  Rick Green was named to the AP All American team as well as the OVC Defensive Player of the Year and Feix was named Divisional Kodak College Coach-of-the-Year.  The All OVC team included Green, Sheroid Barrett, Chip Carpenter, Walt Herod, John Leathers, and Keith Tandy.

Schedule

References

Western Kentucky
Western Kentucky Hilltoppers football seasons
Ohio Valley Conference football champion seasons
Grantland Rice Bowl champion seasons
Western Kentucky Hilltoppers football